Sherlock: The Riddle of the Crown Jewels is an interactive fiction computer game designed by Bob Bates and published by Infocom in 1987. Like most titles Infocom produced, the use of ZIL made it possible to release the game simultaneously for many popular computer platforms, including the Apple II, DOS and Commodore 64. Sherlock is based on the legendary fictional detective Sherlock Holmes, created by Sir Arthur Conan Doyle. It is Infocom's thirty-first game and is the first of two Infocom games developed by Challenge, Inc. using Infocom's development tools.

Plot
The year is 1887, and all of England is gearing up for the celebration of Queen Victoria's golden jubilee, marking her 50th year as monarch. London, naturally, is especially frenzied. Reading the paper one morning, Sherlock Holmes seizes upon one seemingly unimportant notice: The Tower of London has been closed for "reasons of security". The great detective is unsurprised when, moments later, he is asked to investigate the theft of the Crown Jewels. The clues left behind, however, positively reek of a carefully laid trap; Sherlock decides that he must step aside and allow Dr. Watson to pursue the thief instead. If the jewels are not replaced within 48 hours, the British government will be forced to admit that their most prized possessions were stolen and suffer worldwide humiliation.

The player fills the role of Watson, travelling around London in Hansom cabs while attempting to recover the Crown Jewels while encountering many characters from Doyle's stories such as Mrs. Hudson, Mycroft Holmes, and Wiggins of the Baker Street Irregulars. A series of riddles and clues lead Watson on a hunt for inscribed jewels hidden at several famous sites across the city, including Westminster Abbey, Madame Tussauds Wax Museum, London Bridge, and Big Ben. Eventually, the villain is revealed as Professor Moriarty, who captures both Watson and Holmes. With quick thinking and the help of some humble medical supplies, however, Watson manages to subdue Moriarty and return the Jewels to the Tower in time.

Production
Sherlock: The Riddle of the Crown Jewels was the first Infocom game to be developed by another company, Challenge Inc, published by Infocom in their "Immortal Legends" genre. The only other game published in this line was Arthur: The Quest for Excalibur, also written by Bates.

References

External links
 
 
 Scans of the Sherlock package, documentation and feelies
 Infocom-if.org's entry for Sherlock
 

1980s interactive fiction
1987 video games
Amiga games
Apple II games
Classic Mac OS games
Commodore 64 games
Detective video games
DOS games
Infocom games
Interactive fiction based on works
Riddle of the Crown Jewels, The
Video games developed in the United States
Video games set in London
Video games set in the 19th century